Johnson School is an historic building located on the west side of Davenport, Iowa, United States. It was listed on the Davenport Register of Historic Properties on November 30, 2004.  It was built as an elementary school in 1910 for the Davenport Community School District and ceased functioning as a school in 2002 along with Grant Elementary School.  Controversy surrounded the school board's decision to close both schools.   Today it is owned and operated by The Five Points Wellness Center and houses The Institute of Therapeutic Massage and Wellness, 5 Points Wellness Chiropractic, Hypnotherapy by JT, Wiz of Oz Photography, Family Empowerment Services, The Dance Centers of Iowa, QC Theatre Workshop, and Studio Mezik.

References

School buildings completed in 1910
Defunct schools in Iowa
Davenport Register of Historic Properties
Buildings and structures in Davenport, Iowa